Eynibulaq (also, Eynibulag, Eyni-Bulagi, and Eynibulak) is a village and municipality in the Siazan Rayon of Azerbaijan.  It has a population of 915.

References 

Populated places in Siyazan District